The slaty-backed jungle flycatcher (Vauriella goodfellowi) is a species of birds in the Old World flycatcher family Muscicapidae. It is endemic to the Philippines. The specific epithet honours the British zoological collector Walter Goodfellow.  Its natural habitat is subtropical or tropical moist montane forests. It is becoming rare due to habitat loss.

This species was previously placed in the genus Rhinomyias but was moved to Vauriella after a detailed molecular phylogenetic study published in 2010 found that Rhinomyias was polyphyletic.

References

slaty-backed jungle flycatcher
Birds of Mindanao
slaty-backed jungle flycatcher
Taxonomy articles created by Polbot